Baskaran may refer to:

Surname:
Adhiban Baskaran (born 1992), Indian chess Grandmaster
Commando A Baskaran, Chairman of Tiruvallur town
Ganapathy Baskaran, Indian theoretical physicist
Kasinatha Baskaran (born 1968), professional Indian Kabaddi sportsman
S. Theodore Baskaran (born 1940), Indian film historian and wildlife conservationist
Sathasivam Baskaran, Sri Lankan Tamil distributor for the Tamil newspaper Uthayan
Vasudevan Baskaran (born 1950), Indian field hockey player'
Vigneshwaran Baskaran (born 1990), Indian professional footballer
Vinoth Baskaran (born 1990), Singaporean cricketer

Given name:
Baskaran Kandiah, Sri Lankan businessman, co-founder and Director of Lebara Group
Baskaran Pillai, authority of the Tamil Siddha tradition
Baskaran Ranjit (born 1991), Indian cricketer

See also
25653 Baskaran, minor planet, 3.5 km diameter, discovered 5 January 2000
Mallakam Sri Baskaran Cricket Ground, in Mallakam, Jaffna District, Sri Lanka
Balasekaran
Baska (disambiguation)
Boškarin